This is the discography of rapper Young Noble.

Albums

Studio albums
Noble Justice (May 28, 2002, Outlaw)
Son of God (November 12, 2012, Outlaw)
Powerful (September 13, 2016, Outlaw)
3rd Eye View (September 13, 2019, Outlaw)

Collaboration albums
With Layzie Bone of Bone Thugs-n-Harmony – Thug Brothers (February 7, 2006, Real Talk)
With E.D.I. of Outlawz – Against All Oddz (March 7, 2006, Real Talk)
With stic.man of dead prez – Soldier 2 Soldier (October 3, 2006, Real Talk) 
With Hussein Fatal – Thug in Thug Out (September 11, 2007, High Powered Entertainment/Thugtertainment/Outlaw/Koch)
With Lil' Flip – All Eyez on Us (March 4, 2008, Real Talk/E1 Music)
With Deuce Deuce of Concrete Mob – Fast Life (February 5, 2013, Concrete Enterprises/Outlaw)
With Gage Gully – The Year of the Underdogz (May 7, 2013, A.G.E. Entertainment/Outlaw)
With Hussein Fatal – Jerzey Giantz (March 17, 2014, Thugtertainment/Outlaw)
With Deuce Deuce of Concrete Mob – The Code (April 25, 2016, Concrete Enterprises)
With Krayzie Bone of Bone Thugs-n-Harmony – Thug Brothers 2 (June 16, 2017, Real Talk)
With Krayzie Bone of Bone Thugs-n-Harmony – Thug Brothers 3 (October 6, 2017, Real Talk)
With Deuce Deuce of Concrete Mob – For My People (November 17, 2017, Concrete Enterprises)
With Deuce Deuce of Concrete Mob – Growth (March 1, 2019, Concrete Enterprises)
With Deuce Deuce of Concrete Mob – Watch the Signs (July 17, 2020, Concrete Enterprises)
With Dirty Bert - Crazy 80's Babies (June 16, 2021, Outlaw Recordz/Broken Novel ENT)
With Deuce Deuce of Concrete Mob – Purpose (March 3, 2023, Concrete Enterprises)

Compilation album
 Young Noble & JT the Bigga Figga Presents: Street Warz (October 22, 2002, Get Low/Outlaw)
Noble Justice: The Lost Songs (March 23, 2010, Outlaw)
Fire in My Soul (An Acoustic Experience) EP (October 28, 2022, Outlaw Recordz)

Mixtapes
 Outlaw Rydahz Vol. 1 (March 6, 2012, Outlaw/NJ Entertainment)
 DJ Outlaw Presents Young Noble - Outlaw Nation (October 15, 2012, Outlaw)
 DJ Outlaw Presents Young Noble - Outlaw Nation Vol. 2 (April 15, 2013, Outlaw)
 Young Noble & Hussein Fatal Presents - Outlaw Nation Vol. 3 (September 12, 2013, Outlaw/Thugtertainment)
 Young Noble Presents - Outlaw Nation Vol. 4 (September 13, 2014, Outlaw)
 Young Noble Presents - Outlaw Nation Vol. 5 (June 16, 2018, Outlaw)
 Young Noble Presents - Outlaw Nation Vol. 6 (December 23, 2019, Outlaw)
 Young Noble Presents - Outlaw Nation Vol. 7 (April 9, 2021, Outlaw Recordz)
 Young Noble Presents - Outlaw Nation Vol. 8 (June 16, 2022, Outlaw Recordz)

Singles

As featured performer
 2009: "Bad Enough" (Redzz aka RedMusicUk feat. Shade Sheist, TQ & Young Noble)
 2010: "The International Way" (Zeus feat. Young Noble)
 2011: "Girl Don't Give Up" (Nameless Kx feat. Aktual & Young Noble)
 2012: "Home" (Perx feat. Young Noble)
 2012: "Aim At da Police" (Calaber feat. Young Noble)
 2012: "Harda" (Mista Joe feat. Young Noble)
 2013: "Hustlers Anthem" (Kray feat. Young Noble & Bizzy Bone)
 2013: "Get Em" (The Marsonist feat. Young Noble)
 2013: "What I Stand for" (Tre Dolla feat. Young Noble & Hussein Fatal)

Guest appearances

Music videos

References

Hip hop discographies
Discographies of American artists